Lithodora fruticosa, or the shrubby gromwell, is a small 15–60 cm high densely branched perennial shrub. Its erect young stems are covered with short white hairs, while Its older stems have peeling grey bark and are frequently gnarled and twisted. The up to 25 mm long alternate leaves have a covering of flattened hairs and as they grow older they often develop  small raised nodules or tubercules particularly near their edges which are downturned. The flowers  which are about 15 mm long, vary in colour from violet to an intense blue, with a long petal tube, corolla tubes hairless on outside and only sparsely bristly-haired  on the outside of the corolla lobes. Flowers from March to May. The hairy calyx has 5 lobes joined only near the base. The nutlets are up to 4 mm long.

Habitat 
Dry ground, stony hillsides usually on limestone.

Distribution
France, Portugal, Spain, Morocco and Algeria.

Gallery

References 

 Flowers of South Western Europe a field guide, Oleg Polunin, B. E. Smythies, 1973, Oxford University Press, Ely House, London W. 1, 
 Mediterranean Wild Flowers, Marjorie Blamey & Christopher Grey-Wilson, HarperCollinsPublishers, 1993, 
 Field Guide to Wild Flowers of Southern Europe, Paul Davies, Bob Gibbons, the Crowood Press,

External links
 http://waste.ideal.es/lithodorafruticosa.htm
 http://floressilvestresdelmediterraneo.blogspot.no/2012/12/boraginaceae-lithodora-fruticosa.html
 http://i-natura.blogspot.no/2012/04/lithodora-fruticosa-hierba-de-las-7.html
 https://www.inaturalist.org/taxa/186128-Lithodora-fruticosa
 http://herbarivirtual.uib.es/cas-uv/especie/5881.html
 http://www.ecured.cu/index.php/Archivo:Hierba_de_las_siete_sangrías.jpg
 http://crdp.ac-besancon.fr/flore/Boraginaceae/ESPECES/lithodora_fruticosa.htm
 http://www.hipernatural.com/es/plthierba_7sangrias.html
 https://www.flickr.com/photos/sveineriklarsen/14142470292/ 
 http://davesgarden.com/guides/pf/go/192123/

fruticosa
Flora of France
Flora of Spain
Flora of Morocco
Flora of Algeria